Hom-e Khosrow (also Romanized as Ḩom-e Khosrow; also known as Khom-e Khosrow and Khum-e Khosrow) is a village in Khezel-e Sharqi Rural District, Khezel District, Nahavand County, Hamadan Province, Iran. At the 2006 census, its population was 127, in 31 families.

References 

Populated places in Nahavand County